Old Town Railway Cutting is a 1.78 hectare geological Site of Special Scientific Interest in Swindon, Wiltshire, notified in 1975.  It is near the site of the former Swindon Town railway station.

The site is notable for an unusual exposure of the Kimmeridge Clay formation.

Sources
 Natural England citation sheet for the site (accessed 7 April 2022)

External links
 Natural England website (SSSI information)

Sites of Special Scientific Interest in Wiltshire
Sites of Special Scientific Interest notified in 1975
Railway cuttings in the United Kingdom
Rail transport in Wiltshire
Parks and open spaces in Swindon
Transport in Swindon
Geology of Wiltshire